Philip Moore (1853–1902) was a United States Navy sailor and a recipient of the United States military's highest decoration, the Medal of Honor.

Biography
Born in 1853 in Newfoundland, Moore immigrated to the United States and joined the Navy from Rhode Island. On that day, while Trenton was at Genoa, Italy, he and Seaman John Russell jumped overboard and rescued Ordinary Seaman Hans Paulsen from drowning. For this action, both Moore and Russell were awarded the Medal of Honor four years later, on October 18, 1884.

Moore's official Medal of Honor citation reads:
For jumping overboard from the U.S.S. Trenton, at Genoa, Italy, 21 September 1880, and rescuing from drowning Hans Paulsen, ordinary seaman.

See also

List of Medal of Honor recipients during peacetime

References

External links

1853 births
1902 deaths
People from Newfoundland (island)
Canadian emigrants to the United States
United States Navy sailors
United States Navy Medal of Honor recipients
Canadian-born Medal of Honor recipients
Non-combat recipients of the Medal of Honor